Pandit Jawaharlal Nehru, the first Prime Minister of India, died in the afternoon of 27 May 1964, at the age of 75, of a heart attack.

Death
Nehru had been in declining health for some time. He suffered a serious stroke in early 1964. From 23 to 26 May, he went to Dehradun for a short rest, returning to his official residence at Teen Murti Bhawan in New Delhi. He woke early the next morning and after complaining of a pain in his back, suffered a stroke at 6:25 and fell unconscious and without having regained consciousness he died at 13:44.

Aftermath
During the evening of 27 May, Indian Army engineers prepared a cremation ground, levelling a plot of land situated near the Yamuna River about 300 yards north of the Raj Ghat and constructing a link road from the main road leading to the area. From 18:00 that evening until the following morning, flag officers representing the Indian Armed Forces maintained a constant vigil by the body of Nehru while it lay in state, rotating every hour. The officers were:

Major General Amrik Singh (Military Secretary, Indian Army)
Major General R. N. Nehra (Deputy Quartermaster-General, Indian Army)
Major General D. B. Chopra (Chairman, Joint Planning Commission, Indian Army)
Major General S. P. Vohra (Director of Corps of Electrical and Mechanical Engineers, Indian Army)
Major General S. N. Mubayi (Director of Ordnance, Indian Army)
Air Vice-Marshal Ramaswamy Rajaram (Deputy Chief of Air Staff, Indian Air Force)
Air Vice-Marshal H. N. Chatterjee (Air Officer-in-Charge Maintenance Command, Indian Air Force)
Air Vice-Marshal B. V. Malse
Commodore Douglas St. John Cameron (Chief of Personnel, Indian Navy)

Funeral
Nehru was accorded a state funeral with full military honours. The three chief pall bearers were the chiefs of each branch of the Indian Armed Forces: General Jayanto Nath Chaudhuri (Indian Army), Vice Admiral Bhaskar Sadashiv Soman (Indian Navy) and Air Marshal Aspy Engineer (Indian Air Force).

On the morning of 28 May, Nehru's body, draped with the national flag, was placed on a ceremonial gun carriage by six pallbearers representing the Indian Armed Forces, with two officers from each armed force. The six officers were:
Lieutenant General A. C. Iyappa
Lieutenant General M. S. Pathania
Rear Admiral B. N. Lele
Air Vice-Marshal S. N. Goyal
Air Vice-Marshal B. V. Male
Commodore Sourendra Nath Kohli

The army officers were placed at the front of the bier to place Nehru's body onto the gun carriage, which was then drawn through the streets of Delhi by three groups of servicemen, one from each armed service.

Despite it being contrary to his express wishes, Nehru was cremated by Hindu rites. The cremation took place at Shantivan. The samadi in the form of a large base covered with a lawn is located north of Raj Ghat, the Samadhi of Mahatma Gandhi on the banks of the Yamuna, witnessed by 1.5 million mourners who had flocked into the streets of Delhi and the cremation grounds. At the cremation ground, seven senior military officers (Major Generals D. B. Chopra, S. P. Vohra and R. N. Batra from the army, Captains K. K. Sanjana and V. A. Kamath from the navy and Air Commodores Hari Chand Dewan and Hrushikesh Moolgavkar from the air force) lifted the bier bearing Nehru's body from the gun carriage and onto their shoulders. The bearers carried the bier inside the cremation ground, placed Nehru's body on the funeral pyre and saluted the bier before moving away. The six pallbearers then removed the pall from Nehru's body before the pyre was lit.

Dignitaries
The following dignitaries attended Nehru's state funeral:

Dispersal of ashes
In his will, composed on 21 June 1954 and released to the public on 3 June 1964, Nehru had requested his body be cremated and his ashes scattered across India:

"I am proud of that great inheritance that has been and is ours, and I am conscious that I too, like all of us, am a link in that unbroken chain which goes back to the dawn of history in the immemorial past of India. That chain I would not break, for I treasure it and seek inspiration from it. And as witness of this desire of mine and as my last homage to India's cultural inheritance, I am making this request that a handful of my ashes be thrown into the Ganga at Allahabad to be carried to the great ocean that washes India's shore. The major portion of my ashes should, however, be disposed of otherwise. I want these to be carried high up into the air In an aeroplane and scattered from that height over the fields where the peasants of India toil, so that they might mingle with the dust and soil of India and become an indistinguishable part of India."

Accordingly, on 7 June 1964, a portion of Nehru's ashes which had been returned to Teen Murti Bhawan left the residence in a funerary urn on a ceremonial gun carriage, preceded by the three armed service chiefs in a car. The ashes were then conveyed by a special train from New Delhi to Allahabad, where they were taken in a motorcade to Anand Bhawan, the Nehru family home, for one hour. They were then escorted by motorcade through Allahabad to the Sangam Ghat. At the ghat, the ashes were transferred to a white-painted amphibious DUKW which took the ashes to a spot in the Ganges, accompanied by two other DUKW craft carrying dignitaries, telecommunications personnel and an Indian Army brass band. The band played the hymn "Abide with Me" a moment before the urn and the ashes were immersed in the Ganges, a gun at Allahabad Fort firing a salute at the exact moment of the immersion. Two other portions of ashes were taken by government officials to the Nicobar Islands and to Port Blair; those ashes were immersed in the ocean on 8 June.

Between 8:00 and 12:00 on 12 June, the major portion of the ashes were simultaneously scattered by IAF aircraft at 20 previously designated locations around the country.

Reactions

Africa
 - President Kwame Nkrumah expressed his "sense of personal loss in the death of Nehru," and that he was sure these feelings were "shared by you all in Ghana as well as millions in other parts of Africa and Asia. Rarely have the qualities of wisdom, courage, humanity and great learning found such perfect fusion and expression in one individual as they did in Shri Nehru. Soft in speech, but forthright in expression, his voice was heard in the counsels of the world in defence of freedom and dignity of man." Nkrumah added Nehru's "sympathy and understanding of the problems of Africa were a great source of courage to all who have been engaged in [the] struggle for [the] liberation and unity of Africa." 

 - President Ibrahim Abboud of the Republic of the Sudan said, "Your country, your people and, indeed the whole  world will miss this truly  great leader and statesman who  was  a   man  of extreme courage, an ardent advocate of peace and a great champion of human liberty."

Asia
 - Vice-President Fazıl Küçük said, "Pandit Nehru's  death is certainly an irreparable loss, not only for India but for the whole world. The ideals for which this great man fought and the achievements he has brought about during his lifetime will be an ever burning torch diffusing rays of inspiration and wisdom to all the peoples of the world. 

 - President Abdullah al-Sallal said, "The people and Government of Yemen dip their flag with all peace-loving nations of the world over the passing away of the greatest fighter for peace. We are deeply shocked and share the sorrow of all citizens of India and of all those who believed all over the world in the freedom of peoples and in world peace.

:
President Ayub Khan said, "The untimely demise of Mr. Nehru is the loss of a great Indian leader who commanded not only admiration but also the devotion of his people. It is an irreparable loss to India and I wish to convey to you and through you to the Government and people of India our  sincere sympathy in their bereavement."
The West Pakistan Provincial Assembly offered "heartfelt and sincere sympathy to the Government and People of India on their great loss in the sad demise of Pandit Jawaharlal Nehru. The Assembly adjourned without transacting business after observing two minutes' silence in memory of the "great fighter for freedom."

 - Prince Faisal sent condolences to the President of India and Indira Gandhi. 

:
State of Aden - Chief Minister Zain Baharoon said, "It made me very sad to hear of the death of Mr. Nehru...This is certainly a great loss of a great man who has made himself, his people and the cause of all Orientals felt and known in the whole world." 

 - President Cemal Gursel said, "I wish to convey on behalf of the people of Turkey and on my own behalf our deep sympathies and sincere condolences to Your Excellency [the President of India] as well as to the Indian nation for this irreplaceable loss."

Europe
Eastern Europe and Warsaw Pact
 - Chairman of the GDR State Council Walter Ulbricht said, "On behalf of the population of the German Democratic Republic and the State Council of the  German    Democratic Republic and in my name permit me...to convey my deep felt condolence and beg that our feelings be made known to the relatives of the departed and to the population of the Republic of India. The population of the German  Democratic  Republic shares the sorrow  of the Indian  people and the whole of peace-loving humanity at the demise of the eminent statesman who tirelessly fought for the preservation of peace and who also clearly advocated a peaceful solution to questions concerning Germany. The State Council and the population of the  German Democratic Republic will hold the memory of the great son of the Indian people in permanent honour." Premier Otto Grotewohl and Foreign Minister Lothar Bolz also conveyed their condolences.

President Josip Broz Tito said, "The news of the sudden death of the great leader  of the Indian  people, Mr. Jawaharlal Nehru, has deeply  distressed all over. In his  death, the  Indian people  suffered a  great loss  because he leaves the scene of internal and international development right at a time when his  contribution was of great significance." 
Prime Minister Petar Stambolic said, "He was not only a great Indian but an outstanding figure in the modern world and for world peace. It is  a great loss for peace and progress in the world."

Western Europe

 - President Charles de Gaulle said, "It  was with  great emotion that I learned of the death of Pandit  Jawaharlal  Nehru, a statesman whose eminent  qualities placed at the service  of democratic, social  progress and peace profoundly marked the destiny of India and coosequently that of the world."

 - Prime Minister Tage Erlander said, "I am deeply touched by the death of Jawaharlal  Nehru. His life and work were of the greatest importance not only for India but also for the  entire world. His  death is a  great loss to us all."

:
Queen Elizabeth II said, "I am deeply grieved to hear of the death of Mr. Nehru, who will be mourned throughout the Commonwealth and among the peace-loving peoples  of the world. My husband and my family join me in sending our deep and sincere sympathy to you [the President of India] and to the people of India in the irreparable loss which you have suffered."
Prime Minister Alec Douglas-Home said, "My colleagues and I are deeply  distressed to learn of Mr. Nehru's  death.  We mourn the death of the architect of modern India, a wise and far-sighted world statesman, and above all an eminent and respected Commonwealth leader. His  death will be a grievous loss to the Commonwealth and to the world.  We send our heartfelt    sympathy and condolences to the Government of India on their great loss."
Former Prime Minister Clement Attlee, Prime Minister at the time of Indian independence, said Nehru "was a great world figure and perhaps might be regarded as a  doyen of world  statesmen." Observing Nehru as a man "singularly free of bitterness," Attlee added Nehru  had been put in prison by British Governments for many years yet he never showed any bitterness but with "wise statesmanship did all he could to promote friendship between the two peoples. I, of  course,  knew him well and valued his friendship".
Chairman of the Labour Party Anthony Greenwood said, "Mr. Nehru was an outstanding  power in working for peace and  the world   is  much poorer for his loss. Our thoughts go out to the Indian people at this tragic moment." He added that he had known Nehru "for more than 30 years" and that his  death was "a great loss" 

 - President Heinrich Luebke said, "With the death of Mr. Jawaharlal Nehru, India and the whole of mankind have lost an eminent statesman who was held in high esteem throughout the world as a leader in the struggle for peace and international understanding. His sincere personality and the ideals he stood for will never be forgotten in Germany.

Oceania
 - Prime Minister Robert Menzies said, "This is a significant date in history. It marks the end of the life of one of the most remarkable men of our time.  Mr. Nehru was the maker of modern India. He had survived with a singular balance of mind both hardships and successes. He occupied a  place in the hearts and  hopes of his hundreds  of  millions of people which it will not be easy  for any successor to attain. His great gifts and his unceasing and positive interest in world affairs gave him a notable standing in world negotiations and conferences. When the Commonwealth Prime Ministers meet in London in July it will be difficult to realise that he has gone and that we shall see and hear him no more."

References

1964 in India
Jawaharlal Nehru
Funerals by person
State funerals in India
Deaths by person in India